Sally Noble was the last speaker of the Chimariko language. She worked with linguist and ethnologist J.P. Harrington to record what she remembered of the language.

References

Last known speakers of a Native American language
Native Americans in California